The National Peasants' Games are a quadrennial multi-sport event in China in which competitors from among the country's 750 million rural residents take part in sports, both conventional - including basketball, athletics, table tennis, shooting, xiangqi (Chinese chess) and t'ai chi, and traditional rural and Chinese activities, such as wushu, dragon boat racing, lion dancing, tyre pushing, food-carrying, rice planting, kite flying, jianzi (kick shuttlecock) and tug of war. All of China's 31 provinces, autonomous regions and municipalities, as well as Taiwan, are represented. Hong Kong and Macau usually send observer delegations.

The games emphasise recreation more than results, according to the official Xinhua news agency, and the event is claimed to be the world's only regular sports meeting for peasants. For the government, the games "showcase the achievements made by the Chinese people in the 30 years of the reform and opening up to the outside world," in the words of Chinese Agricultural Minister Sun Zhengcai, at the opening of the sixth event.

Early history
The first National Peasants' Games, held in Beijing in 1988, comprised seven events, all of them conventional sports: basketball, table tennis, Chinese-style wrestling (possibly shuai jiao), athletics, cycling, shooting and football.

At the second Games, in Xiaogan in Hubei province, the alignment with 'peasant activity' began.  Traditional pastimes of xiangqi (Chinese chess) and t'ai chi were added, while football was omitted and shooting was replaced by the 'militiaman triathlon' (shooting, grenade throwing and a five-kilometre cross-country race).

The 1996 Games, in Shanghai, introduced dragon dancing as an event, and attracted foreign media coverage.

At the fourth Games, in Mianyang in 2000, dragon boat racing, kite flying and jianzi (kick shuttlecock) were added as events.

The fifth National Peasants' Games were held in October 2004 in Yichun, in Jiangxi province, with the participation of 2,560 athletes. At the event, which dovetailed with China celebrating "the year of sports in rural areas", angling and 'rice planting' were added to the roster.

2008 Games
The sixth games, held in Quanzhou, in eastern Fujian Province, began on 26 October 2008 with around 3,500 competitors taking part in 15 sports and over 180 events. Entrance to all events was free to spectators.

The event involved the construction or renovation of 15 stadiums at a cost of nearly $1 billion, including a new 32,000-seat venue, the Haixia (Straits) Stadium, used for the opening and closing ceremonies.

A new event in 2008 was Yangko dance, a traditional folk dance popular in China's northern provinces.

Editions

See also
 All-China Games
 China National Youth Games
 National Games of China
 Sport in China

References

External links
The Sixth Chinese National Peasants' Games - official website 

1988 establishments in China

China
Recurring sporting events established in 1988
Multi-sport events in China